Tremors is a 2003 American television show based on the Tremors franchise. Originally airing with its episodes out of order on the Sci-Fi Channel, it was later aired in its proper sequence on the G4 Network.

Plot
The story for the TV series picks up from where Tremors 3: Back to Perfection left off. It follows the residents of Perfection Valley attempting to co-exist with an albino Graboid (El Blanco) while dealing with problems caused by failed government experiments, mad scientists, or ruthless real-estate developers. When initially-aired by Syfy, the episodes were shown out of order, with Episode 1 ("Feeding Frenzy") and Episode 6 ("Ghost Dance") shown on the premiere night. The second episode produced, "Shriek and Destroy", was the final episode shown. This out-of-order airing required the re-editing of various episodes. Changes included a new opening sequence for Episode 5 ("Project 4-12"), which aired as the eighth episode. This episode also introduced the character Cletus Poffenburger (played by Christopher Lloyd). The re-edited episode explained Cletus' appearance in a flashback sequence, occurring prior to Episode 6, "Ghost Dance", which had actually aired as the second in the series.

Cast

Episode List
Episodes are listed in the order they were originally broadcast. However, the Sci-Fi Channel did not like the episode "Shriek and Destroy" and aired "Ghost Dance" in its place. Various other episodes are also aired out of order.

The original intended order of the episodes is the following; this is also the order of the episodes on the DVD set:

 “Feeding Frenzy”
 “Shriek And Destroy”
 “Blast From The Past”
 “Hit And Run”
 “Project 4-12”*
 “Ghost Dance”*
 “Night Of The Shriekers”
 “A Little Paranoia Among Friends”
 “Flora Or Fauna?”*
 “Graboid Rights”
 “Water Hazard”*
 “The Sounds Of Silence”*
 “The Key”*
*Episodes containing a Mixmaster subplot

Production
Tremors: The Series was produced at the same time as Tremors 4: The Legend Begins. The show was mistakenly believed to be a replacement for the canceled Farscape, which led to a massive uproar from Farscapes fan base, despite the fact that production for Tremors had begun several months prior to the cancellation of Farscape.

Brent Maddock and S.S. Wilson had penned up a Tremors-based TV show as far back as 1993, under the titles Val & Earl: Monster Hunters, Tremors: The Lost Monsters, and Tremors: The Adventures of Val & Earl. Many plot and monster ideas from this failed television series would be recycled for Tremors: The Series, such as a giant shrimp, flesh-eating insects, and shriekers attacking an amusement park. Production took place at Fox Studios Baja Peninsula facilities and on locations in nearby Rosarito, Mexico on the same set as Titanic; all of Titanic'''s remaining sets were destroyed to make way for this show's production.

The pilot episode premiered on March 28, 2003, and broke records for the Sci-Fi Channel, becoming the network's highest-rated debut episode for a new series, and becoming one of the most-watched events in the history of the channel. While the show would continue to perform well, the number of views per episode drastically declined over the ensuing months, failing to hit Farscapes projected prime time air slot demographic numbers. Further episodes also began to receive increasingly negative criticisms from fans and viewers, bringing down the show's ratings even more. The network began losing money due to budgetary concerns and the show was deemed too expensive to continue, eventually being canceled after one half-season of 13 episodes. 

According to Maddock and Wilson, the channel "absolutely hated" episode "Shriek & Destroy"'' and initially refused to air it, cutting six minutes of its runtime before airing it after the show had already been canceled. Most of the other episodes were aired out of order despite an established continuity, and had to be re-edited last minute for the show to maintain continuity. Maddock and Wilson still do not know why the episodes were aired in a "seemingly random" order.

After a review, comparing the episode numbers and episode names using the series purchased on iTunes and cross-referencing it with the episode information listed in Amazon Prime video, it seems that both locations have matching incorrect information in that the episodes are numbered in order that they were broadcast (not correct chronological order for continuity). It also appears that the series is no longer available for purchase/download from iTunes or Amazon Prime video as of 11 April 2021.

Home video release
For several years after cancellation, the series was not available on any form of physical or digital media, and only a handful of episodes could be found on low-quality bootleg recordings. Half of the show was finally added to iTunes in September 2008 but many episodes were still missing, leading to speculation that some episodes were permanently lost. It was later made fully available on Hulu and through Amazon.com's Unbox video download service in November 2009, with several episodes finally becoming widely seen for the first time since their original airings six years prior.

On March 9, 2010, Universal Studios Home Entertainment finally released the complete series on a three-disc DVD set. The set contains all 13 episodes in their original production order and no bonus features. The set also contains the re-edited version of the episode “Project 4-12” with the alternate beginning and ending scenes. Although all episodes are maintained in their original qualities, fans met the DVD set with negative criticism due to its lack of any bonus features, lazy menu screens, and poor cover artwork.

Cancelled revival
In 2017, Syfy announced that it had ordered a pilot episode for a new television series in the franchise. Kevin Bacon was hired to reprise his role from the first film. Vincenzo Natali was set to direct the pilot. The following year in April, Bacon said via his Instagram account that "the network has decided not to move forward".

References

External links
 
 
 
 

Tremors (franchise)
Syfy original programming
Live action television shows based on films
2000s American comic science fiction television series
2003 American television series debuts
2003 American television series endings
Television series by Universal Television